The Mitsubishi Freeca is a compact MPV and pickup truck designed by Mitsubishi Motors and China Motor Corporation for the Asian market, and built in Taiwan, China, the Philippines, Indonesia and Vietnam where it is known as the Mitsubishi Adventure/Kuda/Jolie.

Overview 
The Mitsubishi Freeca was first released on 11 September 1997, and the 50,000th Adventure was manufactured in the Philippines plant in March 2005. In the Philippines, the Adventure was given major redesigns in 2001 and then 2004, then a minor facelift in late 2009. Trims include the GLX, GLX SE, GLS Sport, Super Sport and Grand Sport.

The original pre-facelift model continued to be sold in 2006 as the Adventure GX. They were both sold alongside the facelifted model. It was essentially a stripped down Adventure meant for commercial or fleet use. the "GX" serves as the most basic base-model of the Adventure lineup. Another version of the Adventure GX, called the Adventure TX, was made specifically to be used for taxicabs/UV Express use. Although the TX is seen more of a trim on the Adventure GX rather than another version of the car. Sales of the GX ended in 2017, but few remaining units were sold until 2018 in some dealerships.

The vehicle is also known as the Mitsubishi Kuda in Indonesia where it was locally manufactured by PT Krama Yudha Kesuma Motor and marketed by Krama Yudha Tiga Berlian until 2005 when its manufacturing plant was closed. "Kuda" means horse in Indonesian. It is marketed as the Mitsubishi Jolie in Vietnam. The model name "Freeca" is coined from "free" and "ca", the Taiwanese for vehicle. Badge engineered Taiwanese-made Freecas were also briefly available in the South African market, locally assembled in Cape Town and sold as the Africar Landio and Africar Jockey.

Soueast 
From 2001 to 2017, the Freeca was rebadged by the Soueast brand for China.

Gallery 
Mitsubishi Freeca

Mitsubishi Adventure

Mitsubishi Kuda

Soueast Freeca

Production 

* Freeca and Zinger combined production figures

(Sources: Facts & Figures 2000, Facts & Figures 2005, Facts & Figures 2009, Mitsubishi Motors website)

References 

Freeca
Cars introduced in 1997
2000s cars
2010s cars
Compact MPVs
Rear-wheel-drive vehicles